Qeshlaq-e Geng (also Romanized as Qeshlāq-e Geng) is a village in Jaru Rural District, Palangabad District, Eshtehard County, Alborz Province, Iran. At the 2006 census, its population was 23 families and a total of 104 people.

References 

Populated places in Eshtehard County